Gelechia thymiata is a moth of the family Gelechiidae. It was described by Edward Meyrick in 1929. It is found in North America, where it has been recorded from Arizona.

References

Moths described in 1929
Gelechia